McGaffigan is a surname. Notable people with the surname include:

Andy McGaffigan (born 1956), American baseball player
Patsy McGaffigan (1888–1940), American baseball player

See also
Gaffigan